Malcolm Alfred Warden Harding (born 28 June 1936 in Chesterfield, Derbyshire, England) is an English-born Canadian Anglican Bishop. He was the fifth Bishop of Brandon at the Anglican Church of Canada from 1992 to 2001.

He was educated at The University of Western Ontario and ordained a priest in 1962. He began his career in charge of five rural parishes in the Fredericton Diocese after which he worked for the Children's Aid Society in a number of roles in Ontario until 1973. He became then Rector of St George's, Brandon, Manitoba. He was Archdeacon of the area until 1992 when he ascended to the episcopate. He retired in 2001.

He was the second Anglican Church of Canada bishop to leave, after Don Harvey in November 2007, due to the theological liberalism of the church, becoming a suffragan bishop in the Anglican Network in Canada, then affiliated with the Anglican Church of the Southern Cone of America, and a founding diocese of the Anglican Church in North America, in June 2009.

Notes

1936 births
Living people
Canadian bishops of the Anglican Church in North America
University of Western Ontario alumni
Anglican archdeacons in North America
Anglican bishops of Brandon
20th-century Anglican Church of Canada bishops
21st-century Anglican Church of Canada bishops